Hollow in the Land is a 2017 Canadian thriller film directed by Scooter Corkle. While Keith Miller remains locked behind bars for the  murder of Eli Balkoff, his family is paying the price. A year after Keith's crime, a body is found in a nearby trailer park. Keith's son, Brandon, goes missing and becomes suspect number one. His sister Alison decides to track down her brother to clear his name before the cops get to him. The more she looks, the more people turn up dead.

Plot
It's a year after Keith Miller is locked behind bars for the murder of Eli Balkoff. 
It's a small town up in the mountains with a tight knit community. Tensions are still running high and Alison, Keith’s daughter, has to get her brother Brandon from the local jail yet again after locals taunt him about his father.

Later, Brandon is with his girlfriend Sophie Hinton when her father Earl bursts in and they have an altercation. The police later turn up at Sophie and Brandon's house with news of his death.
With their father in prison for murder, Brandon is instantly considered suspect number one.

Brandon goes missing and his headstrong sister Alison decides to take things into her own hands and track down her brother to clear his name before the cops get to him.

Alison visits the bowling alley looking for information and steals a timetable from behind the bar. She moves onto the ice rink looking for Freya, who tells her that Brandon had a mysterious phone call before going missing. Officer Darryl gives her insight into some police evidence about the crime.

Alison visits the crime scene looking for clues, she finds an object on the floor, but somebody is watching from the shadows.
The Chief and Officer Darryl turn up at her house to quiz her about her visit to the trailer park.

After a brief meeting with Freya she gives Alison an address for Leland, a local drugs dealer. When she arrives there she finds the murdered body of Leland and notices an unusual cigarette butt in the ashtray. The police turn up while she is still at the scene, and immediately assume that Alison is the perpetrator. She manages to escape back to the town and the police begin a search for her.

Alison finds a drunken Lenny in the car park and offers to drive him home in his van. When they get there Charlene's not home, but she notices the same unusual cigarette butt in the ashtray. Charlene fails to turn up for work.

Alison spots Tyler on a motorbike and gives chase, when she catches up with him he says someone else is chasing him, and that he knows where Brandon is; he takes off when he spots another car.

She goes looking for Freya again and learns about a party she might be at, she goes into the liqueur store to get some cans and Dave the proprietor calls the police but she manages to escape again.

She arrives at the party and finds Freya, who tells her that Tyler is hiding up in the hills near the river, and yet again she flees from the locals through a window.

After a night’s rest she arrives at Tyler's hideaway only to find he's been killed as well. Somebody shoots at her from the trees and she is hit in the shoulder. She runs away and sees a red car leaving the scene. She walks along the river looking for help and finds some cabins where Debbie and Ruth live.

She calls Officer Darryl to tell him what's happened, and learns that the cigarette butts are Charlene's, and between them they think they have discovered the motive for what's happening. Debbie and Ruth lend her a van and a gun and she heads back into town to Helen's house. She learns that the red car was Eli's, and that the Chief had an affair with Helen.

She goes over to the Chief's house where Sophie and Charlene are hiding, shots are fired and Charlene is hit in the leg. Officer Darryl turns up to help, and the Chief comes in from behind and shoots Darryl in the stomach, wounding him. Sophie shoots the Chief but he tries to escape in Eli's car. Alison shoots at the car and kills the Chief.
The search party goes out up in the hills looking for Brandon. They eventually find him traumatized and distressed but alive.
They visit their father in the jail.

Cast
Dianna Agron - Alison Miller
Shawn Ashmore - Officer Darryl Tarasoff
Rachelle Lefevre - Charlene Hinters
Michael Rogers - Chief
Brent Stait - Lenny
Jared Abrahamson - Brandon Miller
Sarah Dugdale – Sophie Hinters
John Sampson – Earl Hinters
Jessica McLeod – Freya/Freya's sister's voice
Gina Chiarelli – Helen Balkoff
David Lennon – Tyler
Marilyn Norry – Ruth
Glynis Davies – Debbie
Cameron Hilts – Justin D
Cody Chernenkov - Leland

References

External links 

2017 films
Canadian thriller drama films
English-language Canadian films
2010s English-language films
2010s Canadian films